The 2009 MLS Cup Playoffs is the postseason to Major League Soccer's 2009 season. MLS Cup 2009 concluded the season on November 22, 2009, at Qwest Field in Seattle, Washington. Real Salt Lake won the Cup in penalties over the L.A. Galaxy.

Format 

At the 2009 season's end, the top two teams of each conference made the playoffs; in addition the clubs with the next four highest point totals, regardless of conference, were added to the playoffs. In the first round of this knockout tournament, aggregate goals over two matches determined the winners; the Conference Championships were one match each, with the winner of each conference advancing to MLS Cup.  In all rounds, the tie-breaking method was two 15-minute periods of extra time, followed by penalty kicks if necessary.  The away goals rule was not used.

Standings

Conference standings

Overall standings

Bracket

Conference Semifinals

Eastern Conference

Real Salt Lake advances 4–2 on aggregate.

Chicago Fire advances 3–2 on aggregate.

Western Conference

Los Angeles Galaxy advances 3–2 on aggregate.

Houston Dynamo advances 1–0 on aggregate.

Conference Finals

Eastern Conference

Real Salt Lake advances 5–4 on penalties.

Western Conference

Los Angeles Galaxy advances.

MLS Cup

See also 
2009 Major League Soccer season

References 

2009